Yuen Kong Chau is an island of Hong Kong, under the administration of Sai Kung District. It is located in Rocky Harbour (Leung Shuen Wan Hoi ). The island is within the restricted area of the Basalt Island (Fo Shek Chau) Firing Range.

Uninhabited islands of Hong Kong